Comerío is a town and municipality of Puerto Rico in the center-eastern region of island, north of Aibonito; south of Naranjito and Bayamón; east of Barranquitas; and west of Cidra and Aguas Buenas. Comerío is spread over 7 barrios and Comerío Pueblo (the downtown area and the administrative center of the city). It is part of the San Juan-Caguas-Guaynabo Metropolitan Statistical Area.

History

Comerío was founded on June 12, 1826. Originally named Sabana del Palmar, but later changed to Comerío.

In 1854, nearly 1000 acres (1000 ) of land were being used for agriculture. In 1894, there was one sugar and two coffee plantations (estates) in Comerío. In the early 20th century, Comerio residents, had a short but legendary territory war with residents of the city of Barranquitas.

Puerto Rico was ceded by Spain in the aftermath of the Spanish–American War under the terms of the Treaty of Paris of 1898 and became a territory of the United States. In 1899, the United States Department of War conducted a census of Puerto Rico finding that the population of Comerío was 8,249.

Hurricane Maria on September 20, 2017, triggered numerous landslides in Comerío. The flooded river went through the center of Comerío. A week later the hospital, trying to run via generator, was out of diesel but due to the landslides, travel and deliveries, into and out of Comerío was next to impossible. Over 4,000 homes were affected, and of those 1,537 completely destroyed. After the hurricane, the National Guard from Ohio were tasked with restoring water purification systems for the people of Comerío. Two months after the hurricane, the mayor of Comerío said no personnel had made it yet to attempt the restoration of electrical power to Comerío. On October 9, another landslide happened blocking transit on PR-167. On October 10, a group of doctors from New York announced they would travel to volunteer their services to Comerío and nearby mountain municipalities.

Geography
The rivers located in Comerío are Río de la Plata and Río Hondo.

Barrios

Like all municipalities of Puerto Rico, Comerío is subdivided into barrios.

Cedrito
Cejas
Comerío barrio-pueblo
Doña Elena
Naranjo
Palomas
Piñas
Río Hondo
Vega Redonda

Sectors
Barrios (which are like minor civil divisions) and subbarrios, in turn, are further subdivided into smaller local populated place areas/units called sectores (sectors in English). The types of sectores may vary, from normally sector to urbanización to reparto to barriada to residencial, among others.

Special Communities

 (Special Communities of Puerto Rico) are marginalized communities whose citizens are experiencing a certain amount of social exclusion. A map shows these communities occur in nearly every municipality of the commonwealth. Of the 742 places that were on the list in 2014, the following barrios, communities, sectors, or neighborhoods were in Comerio: Barriada Cielito, Sector Villa Brava in Piñas Abajo, El 26 in Palomas Abajo, El Higüero in Palomas Abajo, El Verde in Naranjo, La Juncia in Río Hondo II, La Pietra Cedrito, Río Hondo, and Vuelta del Dos.

Tourism

Landmarks and places of interest
Some of the landmarks of Comerío include:
La Tiza Peak 
La Mora Caves 
La Plata River
Las Bocas Canyon
Las Pailas 
Los Pilones
Media Luna Recreation Park
Tobacco Warehouse 
The main town square
El Salto Hydroelectric Dams 1 and 2

Economy

Agriculture
Tobacco (not as predominant in recent years). Comerío was known as "El Pueblo del Tabaco" (Tobacco Town), and its original flag had a tobacco plant in its center.

Culture

Festivals and events
Comerío celebrates its patron saint festival in August. The  is a religious and cultural celebration that generally features parades, games, artisans, amusement rides, regional food, and live entertainment.

Other festivals and events celebrated in Comerío include:
Spring Carnival – April 
La Mora Cave Festival – June 1,2,3
Jíbaro Festival – June 
El Jobo Festival – July 
San Andrés Apóstol Festivities – November 
El Seco Marathon – December 
Christmas Fantasy – December

Religion
First Methodist Church of Comerío was founded in 1904.

Demographics

Government

All municipalities in Puerto Rico are administered by a mayor, elected every four years. The current mayor of Comerío is José A. Santiago, of the Popular Democratic Party (PPD). He was elected at the 2000 general elections.

The city belongs to the Puerto Rico Senatorial district VI, which is represented by two senators. In 2012, Miguel Pereira Castillo and Angel M. Rodríguez were elected as district senators.

Symbols
The  has an official flag and coat of arms.

Flag
Quartered in cross, of green and white, and superimposed the right superior quarter is an anchored yellow cross.

Coat of arms
The Comerío coat of arms is made up quarters (4) bearing what is known as an escutcheon of displays a shield in the center. There's a green field with a golden cross in the left quarter which represents Holy Christ the Healer, the patron of the town. Green stripes on a silver field are on the lower left quarter, symbolizing the Comerío falls and the La Plata River. Three royal palms in the right quarter to remember the original name of the town, and an undulating line symbolizes the mist that often covers the town. A crown with Taino motifs represents the cacique. The tobacco plant is a reminder of what was once an important part of the economic activity of the municipality. Inscribed with "the pearl of La Plata" a reference is made to the location of Comerío, on the banks of the La Plata River and the turreted castle which is a symbol of municipalities of Puerto Rico.

Transportation
Public bus from Bayamón to Comerío at Centro de Estacionamiento de Bayamón is the main public transportation.

There are 16 bridges in Comerío.

Notable Comerieños
Celestino J. Pérez – Pharmacist, lawyer and elected legislator 
Claudio Torres – Composer 
Juana Colón (1886–1967) – Founder of the Socialist Party in Comerío 
Manuel A. Pérez (1890–1951) – Professor 
María Arroyo – Teacher, President of the Teachers Association and Senator
Enrique Pérez Santiago – Hematologist
Arturo Perez, Mayor of Comerio elected by Partido Liberal

Gallery

See also

List of Puerto Ricans
History of Puerto Rico
Did you know-Puerto Rico?

References

Further reading

External links 
Puerto Rico Government Directory - Comerío
Municipalities at enciclopediapr.org

 
Municipalities of Puerto Rico
San Juan–Caguas–Guaynabo metropolitan area
Populated places established in 1826
1826 establishments in New Spain
1820s establishments in Puerto Rico